Una Rola Para los Minusvalidos (A Song For The Handicapped) (1994) is the eleventh studio album by Mexican rock-blues band El Tri.

Track listing 
All tracks by Alex Lora except where noted.

 "Todo es Materia" (Everything Is Material) – 3:50
 "Perdedor" (Loser) – 3:56
 "Trabaja Niño, Trabaja" (Work, Child, Work) (Lora, Pedro Martinez) – 6:21
 "Revolución '94" (Revolution) – 4:43
 "La Puerta Falsa" (The False Door) – 4:06
 "Los Minusválidos" (The Handicapped) (Chicho Mora, Lora, Martinez, Rafael Salgado, Ruben Soriano, Felipe Souza) – 3:14
 "La Raza Más Chida" (The Coolest Race) – 4:08
 "Las Piedras Rodantes" (The Rolling Stones) – 3:18
 "Siempre He Sido Banda" (I Have Always Been Band) – 3:00
 "Con la Cola Entre las Patas" (With The Tail Between The Legs) (Lora, Martinez) – 4:22
 "No Me Hagan Perder el Tiempo" (Don't Make Me Waste My Time) – 4:02

Personnel 
 Alex Lora – guitar, vocals, producer, mixing
 Rafael Salgado – harmonic
 Eduardo Chico – guitar
 Pedro Martínez – drums, backing vocals
 Ruben Soriano – bass
 Chela DeLora – backing vocals

Guest musicians 
 Felipe Souza – electric & rhythm guitar, mixing
 Lalo Toral – piano
 Oscar Zarate – guitar

= Technical 
Chuck Johnson – mixing, mixing assistant
Richard Kaplan – engineer, mixing

External links 
www.eltri.com.mx
Una Rola Para los Minusvalidos at MusicBrainz
[ Una Rola Para los Minusvalidos] at AllMusic

El Tri albums
1994 albums
Warner Music Group albums